NGC 600 is an emission-line galaxy in the constellation Cetus. It was discovered by William Herschel on 10 September 1785. The galaxy has a diameter of 70,000 light-years. It is also approximately 90 million light-years from the Milky Way.

See also
List of NGC objects
List of NGC objects (1–1000)

References

External links
 

600
MCG objects
5777
Cetus (constellation)
Barred spiral galaxies
Galaxies discovered in 1785